The Commendation for Gallantry is a military decoration awarded to personnel of the Australian Defence Force, it recognises acts of gallantry in action considered worthy of recognition. The award was introduced on 15 January 1991, replacing the Imperial equivalent of the Mentioned in Despatches. It is ranked fourth in the Gallantry Decorations in the Australian Honours System. Since its inception 68 awards have been made.

Description
 The insignia of the Commendation for Gallantry is a Federation Star superimposed centrally on a gold-plated silver row of flames.
 The insignia is attached to a plain orange ribbon. The centre of the Federation Star is 19 mm from the bottom of the ribbon and 16 mm from either edge.

Recipients
On 6 March 2011 the Commendation for Gallantry was posthumously awarded to 20 Australian prisoners of war who were either killed attempting to escape from the Japanese or were executed after their recapture during the Second World War. The awards followed a review by the independent Defence Honours and Awards Tribunal which found that the men should have been awarded a Mentioned in Despatches under the wartime policy then in place, and consequently were awarded the modern equivalent.

Since its inception 70 awards have been made, with the most recent being announced in the 2015 Australia Day Honours.

See also
Australian Honours Order of Precedence

References

External links
It's an Honour

Military awards and decorations of Australia
Courage awards
1991 establishments in Australia
Awards established in 1991